The 2nd Panzergrenadier Division (2. Panzergrenadierdivision) was a West German mechanized infantry formation. It was part of the III Corps of the Bundeswehr, which also incorporated in 1985 the 5th Panzer Division and 12th Panzer Division. III Corps was part of NATO's Central Army Group (CENTAG), along with the Bundeswehr's II Corps and the American V and VII Corps. In the wake of military restructuring brought about by the end of the Cold War, the 2nd Panzergrenadier Division was disbanded in 1994.

The division was constituted as the 2nd Grenadier Division in Kassel on 1 July 1956 as part of the II Corps (then called "Army Staff II") of the Bundeswehr. At that time, it commanded the "A2" and "B2" battle-groups. In 1957, the division was subordinated to the German III Corps and one year later it received a third battle-group, "C2".  The battle-groups later became the 6th Panzer, 5th Panzergrenadier, and 4th Panzergrenadier Brigades. As part of an army reorganization in 1959, the division was renamed the 2nd Panzergrenadier Division and division headquarters was quartered at Marburg.

In 1970, the division was renamed the 2nd Jäger (light infantry) Division. In 1974, the division headquarters was moved back to Kassel. The division once again became the 2nd Panzergrenadier Division in 1980.  Following the end of the Cold War, the 2nd Panzergrenadier Division was disbanded in 1994.

Commanders

References

Literature 
 Erinnerungsbuch 2. Panzergrenadierdivision, Herausgeber: 2. Panzergrenadierdivision (Major i. G. Dr. phil. Gert-Detlef Feddern), erschienen beim Verlag Moritz Diesterweg, Frankfurt am Main, 1962
 2. Panzergrenadierdivision/Die "Zwote"/Eine Chronik der Geschichte der "Hessischen Division", 1. Auflage 1994, Herausgeber: Kameradschaft 2. Panzergrenadierdivision e. V.

External links 
 Die Geschichte der „Hessischen Division“ 2. Panzergrenadierdivision die „Zwote“ auf Kameradschaft 2. PzGrenDiv Stand 3. Februar 2008
Beschreibung auf www.relikte.com
Die Geschichte der Division im Bundesarchiv

Mechanized divisions of the German Army
Military units and formations established in 1956
Military units and formations disestablished in 1994
1956 establishments in West Germany
1994 disestablishments in Germany